Neoscapteriscus is a genus of two-clawed mole crickets in the family Gryllotalpidae. At least 23 described species are placed in Neoscapteriscus.

Species
 Neoscapteriscus abbreviatus (Scudder, S.H., 1869) (lesser short-winged mole cricket)
 Neoscapteriscus borellii (Giglio-Tos, 1894) (southern mole cricket)
 Neoscapteriscus cerberus (Rodríguez, F. & Heads, 2012)
 Neoscapteriscus costaricensis (Nickle, 2003)
 Neoscapteriscus didactyloides 
 Neoscapteriscus didactylus  (changa mole cricket)
 Neoscapteriscus ecuadorensis 
 Neoscapteriscus grossi 
 Neoscapteriscus imitatus 
 Neoscapteriscus macrocellus 
 Neoscapteriscus mexicanus 
 Neoscapteriscus parvipennis 
 Neoscapteriscus peruvianus 
 Neoscapteriscus quadripunctatus 
 Neoscapteriscus riograndensis 
 Neoscapteriscus rodriguezi 
 Neoscapteriscus saileri 
 Neoscapteriscus tenuis 
 Neoscapteriscus tetradactylus 
 Neoscapteriscus tibiodentalis 
 Neoscapteriscus variegatus 
 Neoscapteriscus vicinus (tawny mole cricket)
 Neoscapteriscus zeuneri

References

 Capinera J.L, Scott R.D., Walker T.J. (2004). Field Guide to Grasshoppers, Katydids, and Crickets of the United States. Cornell University Press.

Further reading

 

Gryllotalpidae